Lee Kyu-hyuk (born 4 May 1999) is a South Korean footballer currently playing as a defender for Jeju United.

Career statistics

Club

References

1999 births
Living people
South Korean footballers
South Korea youth international footballers
Association football defenders
K League 2 players
Jeju United FC players
South Korea under-20 international footballers